Nitrate is  a polyatomic ion with the chemical formula 

Nitrate or nitrates may also refer to:

 Nitrates, a group of salts containing this ion
Nitrate (photography), in photography it is a synonym for chemical nitrocellulose
Nitrate City, Alabama

See also

Nitrite